Tooraweenah is a small village just off the Newell Highway about  north east of Gilgandra in the central west of New South Wales, Australia.

The land surrounding Tooraweenah is used for sheep, cattle, goat and emu grazing. There is broadscale grain cropping as well.

Tooraweenah is often the last stop for tourists on their way from Gilgandra to the Warrumbungle National Park.

Services
caravan park
pub
post office
hardware and agricultural supply store
community technology centre
automotive repair and fuelling
aerodrome

Clubs
tennis club,
 Lions Club,
agricultural show society.
Biddon-Tooraweenah Cricket Club
ABC Shield Premiers 2004/05, 2005/06, 2007/08, 2012/13, 2014/15, 2015/16, 2016/17, 2018/19

Telecommunications
a Telstra Remote Integrated Multiplexor (RIM) provides PSTN telephony and ISDN, and ADSL,
 ABC broadcast FM radio transponders at nearby Needle Mountain (including 105.5 MHz Classic FM, 106.3 MHz News Radio, 107.1 MHz Local Radio, and 107.9 MHz Radio National),
a UHF CB repeater on Channel 1,
an amateur radio repeater on 146.8 MHz.

References

External links

Tooraweenah.com community web hosting

Towns in New South Wales